Klojen is a district (kecamatan) in Malang, East Java, Indonesia. Downtown Malang is located in the district.

Subdistricts 

 Klojen, postal code 65111
 Rampal Celaket, postal code 65111
 Oro-Oro Dowo, postal code 65112
 Samaan, postal code 65112
 Penanggungan, postal code 65113
 Gadingkasri, postal code 65115
 Bareng, postal code 65116
 Kasin, postal code 65117
 Sukoharjo, postal code 65118
 Kauman, postal code 65119
 Kiduldalem, postal code 65119

Geography 
Northern side of Klojen bordering with Lowokwaru and Blimbing subdistricts, eastern side bordering with Kedungkandang subdistrict, southern side bordering with Sukun subdistrict, and western side of Klojen bordering with the Sukun and Lowokwaru sub-districts.

Climate 
The climate in Klojen features tropical monsoon climate (Am) according to Köppen–Geiger climate classification system, as the climate precipitation throughout the year is greatly influenced by the monsoon, bordering with subtropical highland climate (Cwb). Most months of the year are marked by significant rainfall. The short dry season has little impact. The average temperature in Klojen is 23.7 °C. In a year, the average rainfall is 2090 mm.

See also 

 Districts of East Java
 List of districts of Indonesia

References

External links 

 Official website of Kecamatan Klojen

Districts of East Java
Malang